The following is a list of schools that participate in NCAA Division I baseball. In the 2022 season, 301 Division I schools competed. These teams compete to go to the 64-team Division I baseball tournament and then to Omaha, Nebraska, and Charles Schwab Field, for the eight-team Men's College World Series (MCWS).

Conference affiliations are current for the coming 2023 NCAA baseball season. Years of conference changes, indicated in footnotes, reflect baseball seasons, which take place in the calendar year after a conference change takes effect. Numbers of appearances in the NCAA Tournament and MCWS, plus MCWS titles, are current through the 2022 college baseball season.

Another Division I program will be downgraded after the 2023 season. Hartford has begun its plan to transition its athletic department, including baseball, to Division III in 2024.

Division I programs

Schools in transition 
These schools are in transition from Division II or III to Division I. For scheduling purposes, they are considered to be Division I institutions, but they will not be eligible for the NCAA tournament until completing the transition.

New programs 
In September 2017, Akron, a member of the Mid-American Conference, announced that it was planning to reinstate its baseball program, which had been dropped after the 2015 season. Baseball returned for the 2020 season, abbreviated due to COVID-19.

Recently eliminated programs 
 Boise State University, which had reinstated baseball for the 2020 season after a 40-year absence, dropped the sport after that season due to COVID-19-related financial challenges.
 Chicago State University announced in June 2020 that it would drop baseball. The school had been facing major budgetary challenges even before the onset of COVID-19.
 Furman University announced in May 2020 that the Paladins baseball team would be terminated due to budget concerns during the COVID-19 pandemic.
 La Salle also dropped baseball at the end of the 2020–21 academic year for sustainability reasons.
 North Carolina Central discontinued baseball after the 2021 season.

See also 
 List of current NCAA Division I baseball coaches
 List of NCAA Division I baseball venues
 List of defunct college baseball teams

Notes

References 

 
NCAA Division I Baseball Programs
Baseball programs
NCAA Division I